Harbybrow is a small settlement in the parish of Allhallows, Cumbria, England. Consisting of two inhabited dwellings - the old manor house and nearby mill - it is the smallest hamlet in the parish. The pele tower connected to the manor house was used to shelter animals during raids in the days of the border reivers. In recent years the mill has been restored by its current owners.

Hamlets in Cumbria
Allerdale